Samuel Tefera (born 23 October 1999) is an Ethiopian middle distance runner who specialises in the 1500 metres. At the age of 18, he became the 2018 World indoor champion, and defended his title at the 2022 World Indoor Championships, setting the championship record in the process. Tefera is the current African record holder in the indoor event.

He held 1500m world indoor record for three years, with his mark currently being the second-fastest on the world indoor all-time list.

Career
Samuel Tefera made her first major appearance in 2017, when the then-17-year-old represented Ethiopia in the 1500 metres at the World Championships in London, not advancing from the heats.

In March 2018, he won the gold medal in the event at the World Indoor Championships held in Birmingham. He achieved 3:58.19 to beat Marcin Lewandowski (3:58.39) and Abdalaati Iguider (3:58.43).

In February 2019, still 19, Tefera set a world indoor record in his specialty distance at the Birmingham Indoor Grand Prix with a time of three minutes 31.04 seconds. He broke by 0.14 s a 22-year-old mark of Moroccan Hicham El Guerrouj. Tefera's record was bettered in 2022 by Jakob Ingebrigtsen.

After suffering an injury he did not finish his semifinal run at the 2019 World Championships in Doha. Timothy Cheruiyot won the title.

Tefera represented Ethiopia at the delayed 2020 Tokyo Olympics, where he had an injury problem again and was eliminated in the heats of the men's 1500 metres. Ingebrigtsen became the event winner.

At the 2022 World Indoor Championships in Belgrade, Tefera defended his title in a time of 3m 32.77s, beating Ingebrigtsen who ran 3:33.02, and setting the championship record in the process. Abel Kipsang finished third in 3:33.36.

Competition record

References

External links

 

Living people
1999 births
Ethiopian male middle-distance runners
World record holders in athletics (track and field)
World Athletics Indoor Championships winners
Athletes (track and field) at the 2020 Summer Olympics
Olympic athletes of Ethiopia
20th-century Ethiopian people
21st-century Ethiopian people